The Knack …and How to Get It is a 1965 British comedy film directed by Richard Lester and starring Rita Tushingham, Ray Brooks, Michael Crawford, and Donal Donnelly. The screenplay by Charles Wood is based on a play of the same name by Ann Jellicoe. The film is considered emblematic of the Swinging London cultural phenomenon.

The film premiered in-competition at the 1965 Cannes Film Festival, and won the Palme d'Or and the Technical Grand Prize. At the 19th British Academy Film Awards, the film was nominated in six categories, including BAFTA Award for Best Film and Outstanding British Film. Rita Tushingham was nominated for a Golden Globe Award for Best Actress – Motion Picture Comedy or Musical, and the film was nominated for Best English-Language Foreign Film.

Plot
Colin is a nervous schoolteacher working in London, observing rather than participating in the sexual revolution of the 1960s. He has little personal sexual experience and wishes to gain "the knack" of how to seduce women. He turns to his friend and tenant, a confident, womaniser known only by his surname, Tolen. Tolen gives him unhelpful advice to consume more protein and use intuition, acknowledging intuition is not something that can be completely learned, and advocates the importance of domination of women. He suggests that Colin should let another friend move into Colin's spare room, and they could "share" women.

Colin boards the front door shut. Tom, who is passing, takes up occupation of the vacant room. He is obsessed with painting everything white... including the windowpanes. Due to the blocked door Tolen now brings his women in through the window. Colin swaps his single bed for a fancy old double wrought iron bed which he finds in a scrapyard with Tom. Nancy meets Colin at the scrapyard. Nancy is an inexperienced and shy young woman who has arrived to London from out of town, and is searching for the YWCA. She stops by a clothing store and is won over by the flattery of the clerk, until she overhears him repeating the same words to every female customer.

From the scrapyard the three take the bed on a complex and zany journey back to the house. This includes parking it at a parking meter, moving it on a car transporter, floating it along the River Thames, and carrying it down the steps of the Royal Albert Hall.

In a public space, Tolen sexually assaults Nancy, who at first is silent and then faints. When she wakes up she claims she was raped, though this was not the case. Tolen, Colin and Tom are unable to restrain her from loudly repeating the allegations, or puncturing the tyres of Tolen's motorcycle. She runs back to the house, where she throws Tolen's records out of the window and strips naked. The men become convinced her rape allegations reflect rape fantasy and urge Tolen to have sex with her. When Nancy emerges from the room wearing only a robe, she instead expresses more attraction to Colin, and he returns the interest. The two begin living together.

Cast

Production
After seeing Ann Jellicoe's play The Knack, the producers envisioned a film adaptation. They offered the position of director to Lindsay Anderson, who refused.

Having worked with The Beatles on A Hard Day's Night, Lester was another candidate for director, and agreed to take the position. Lester made major changes to the play, adding his own touch through direct address, unexpected oddly-edited sequences, humorous subtitles, and a Greek chorus of disapproving members of "the older generation." Filming took place in a few weeks in November and early December 1964, and Lester employed television advertising techniques. Talking about the film in the 1980s, actor Ray Brooks said: 

Lester himself makes a brief cameo as an annoyed bystander. John Barry contributed the jazzy score, which features a memorable organ solo by Alan Haven. Jane Birkin, Charlotte Rampling, and Jacqueline Bisset all made their first cinematic appearances in the film as extras, together with Top of the Pops disc girl Samantha Juste.

Reception
In The New York Times, Bosley Crowther positively reviewed it as "delightfully mobile" and a "frenziedly running, jumping picture". Variety praised the performances, citing Rita Tushingham as perfect in her role.

In 2016, The Hollywood Reporter ranked it the 49th best film to win the Palme d'Or, stating it "hasn't aged well" but the setting was a great asset. In 2001, the Wallflower Critical Guide noted the creativity in cinematography and editing, but said it disrupted the storytelling.

Accolades
The film was entered into competition at the 1965 Cannes Film Festival, where it won the Palme d'Or.

References

External links

 

1965 films
1965 romantic comedy films
1960s sex comedy films
British black-and-white films
British romantic comedy films
British sex comedy films
Casual sex in films
Films directed by Richard Lester
Films scored by John Barry (composer)
Films set in London
Palme d'Or winners
1960s English-language films
1960s British films